Active Oberon is a general purpose programming language developed during 1996-1998 by the group around Niklaus Wirth and Jürg Gutknecht at the Swiss Federal Institute of Technology in Zürich (ETH Zurich). It is an extension of the programming language Oberon. The extensions aim at implementing active objects as expressions for parallelism. Compared to its predecessors, Oberon and Oberon-2, Active Oberon adds objects (with object-centered access protection and local activity control), system-guarded assertions, preemptive priority scheduling and a changed syntax for methods (named type-bound procedures in Oberon vocabulary). Objects may be active, which means that they may be threads or processes. The operating system named Active Object System (AOS) in 2002, then due to trademark issues, renamed Bluebottle in 2005, and then renamed A2 in 2008, especially the kernel, synchronizes and coordinates different active objects.

Unlike Java or C#, objects may be synchronized not only with signals but directly on conditions. This simplifies concurrent programs and their development.

An Active Oberon fork is the language Zonnon.

See also
A2 (operating system)

References

External links
 ETH Oberon (2019) Language Report
 A2 Operating System & Active Oberon community in Telegram
 A2 user guide and applications description
 Archive Language Report

Class-based programming languages
Modula programming language family
Object-oriented programming languages
Procedural programming languages
Oberon programming language family
Systems programming languages